See also 2008 in birding and ornithology, main events of 2009 and 2010 in birding and ornithology
The year 2009 in birding and ornithology.

Worldwide

New species

See also Bird species new to science described in the 2000s

Taxonomic developments

Ornithologists

Deaths
Bob Scott
David Snow
Donald Trounson
Eric Simms
Geoff Moon
Ian Rowley
James Allen Keast
Kenneth E. Stager
Mitchell Durno Murray
Ravi Sankaran
Richard Zann
S. A. Hussain
William H. Behle

World listing

Europe

Britain

Breeding birds
 A Manx shearwater (Puffinus puffinus) originally ringed on 17 May 1957 at Bardsley Bird Observatory has bred each summer on the island ever since.

Migrant and wintering birds
 Britain's largest flock of whiskered terns (Chlidonias hybridus) (eleven) at Willington Gravel Quarry, Derbyshire on 24 April. Eight remained on 25 April and the flock scattered to other midland and north-east sites over the next few days.

Rare birds
 Britain's second brown-headed cowbird (Molothrus ater) from 8–10 May on Fair Isle.

Other events
 The Ringing Scheme celebrate its centenary, on 17 May, with 36 million birds ringed so far.

Ireland

Rare birds

Scandinavia
 Iceland's third bufflehead, a male at Dynjandi from February to April.

North America
To be completed

References

External links
  British Trust for Ornithology Bird Ringing Scheme

Birding and ornithology
Bird
Birding and ornithology by year